Georges-Elia Sarfati is a philosopher, linguist, poet, and an existentialist psychoanalyst, author of written works in the domains of ethics, Jewish thought, social criticism, and discourse analysis. He has translated Viktor E. Frankl. He is the grand-nephew of the sociologist Gaston Bouthoul.

Biography
G.-E. Sarfati (born in Tunis, 20 October 1957) is a University professor (French linguistic), member of the teaching staff of the Elie Wiesel Center for Jewish Studies, and educational director of the University Center Sigmund Freud in Paris. In 1989, he presented a doctorate thesis under the supervision of Oswald Ducrot at the School for Advanced Studies in the Social Sciences (Paris). In 1996, he was appointed as a research supervisor at the University Sorbonne-Paris IV. He is also a graduate of the Salomon Schechter Institute (Jerusalem, Israel), he has a doctorate in Hebrew and Jewish Studies at the University of Strasbourg.

Main ideas

Aware of the persistence of the "jewish question" in Europe, following Leon Poliakov, and Jean-Pierre Faye, he is – as well as P.-A. Taguieff and S. Trigano – one of the first intellectual to diagnose the emergence of new anti-Semitism through its cultural, ideological, and political variations. The contemporary expression of judeophobia doesn't solely stem from the recycling of the conspiracy theory, it builds upon its establishment in the history of mentalities and speeches. Its platitudes are defining a "negative judeocentrism", related to the spread of the post-modern ideology, characterized by the obviousness of the conformists. The anti-zionist rhetoric, genuinely a part of popular culture, especially in France, is one of the main characteristics of contemporary pseudo-progressivism.

The denunciation of that state of affairs doubles up as a critic of post-genocidal ideology, whereby memory of the Shoah serves as an identity to the survivors of the big slaughter, isolating their dignity as victims, under the express condition that they demonstrate no sympathy towards Israel. Ignorance of Jewish culture is based on three parameters: the biased teaching of Jewish history at school, partial and biased information processing, and exclusive media focus on the conflict in the Middle East.

The history of psychological warfare based upon the examination of rhetorical disinformation, propaganda("totalitarian" or "commercial") rests in principle on the inversion of values, and the strategic designation of a "scapegoat." After two millennia of cultural development, it is not surprising that Jewish symbolism has been subject to all types of distortions. The first lessons of the Jewish Bible (the concepts of the individual, free choice, equality in human dignity, justice, love for neighbors, moral obligation towards everything alien, in the categories of hope and utopia) have been subverted into their opposite, through ideological discourse. This can be seen from the infamous stereotypes that prevailed in the Middle Ages to modern accusations of "communitarianism", "racism", and "cruelty".

It follows that the "globalization" of the market doubles as a "globalization" of this ignorance. In this hazardous context, it is imperative to revive a tradition of scholarship and intellectual clarity, one which specifically rehabilitates textual sources and values of Jewish humanism, restoring a historical heritage broken by a culture of slogan. This perspective includes the exhumation and comments of the scholarly tradition that preceded and accompanied the development of Western civilization, especially the teachings of the Musar, relayed through the rabbinical chain of transmission, the ancient discipline of spiritual exercises.

The analysis of this social pathology brings up questions regarding language mechanisms in the production of opinion (doxa), and the way in which it dominates public space.

This critical point of view contributes to the renewal of social philosophy, showing that in a world saturated by media communication, discourse experiences organize the social representations highly, and determine new forms of alienation and reification. G.-E. Sarfati coined the neologism doxopathia that, in a context of cultural destruction, the enslavement and dependency phenomenon of the masses is a direct result of the automation of the dominant opinion. Extending Antonio Gramsci's thinking about the dissemination of standards, and knowledge through society, he developed a general theory of the common understanding, by creating the methodological tools of a counter-discourse.

But the semantics and anthropological questions surrounding the establishment of a meaning find their other honored expression in the context ofexistential analysis, and logotherapy, where one must give meaning to one's own life, confronted with the requisites of its own existence, by splitting up all determinations that affect the project, with one's current degree of autonomy. From this point of view, the subjective search for meaning remains inseparable from the ethical and political struggle for freedom, from the snares of conformity and totalitarianism.

In light of foregoing aspects of research, the work of poetic language is understood as shimmering memories of a subject through the evocation of the crux of the matter at hand. The exploration of the signs of presence to the world, according to the metamorphoses of history, is a defense of the singularity that confronts the new "idols of the tribe", that is the impersonal rule of "hearsay" and production of an objectified language.

Bibliography

Authority record

 Virtual International Authority File
 International Name Standard Identifier
 Bibliothèque nationale de France
 Système universitaire de documentation
 Library of Congress
 GemeinsameNordatei
 World Cat

Books

Studies, essays, interviews 
 La tradition éthique du judaïsme. Introduction au Moussar, Paris, Berg International, 2014.
 L’histoire à l’œuvre. Trois études sur Emmanuel Lévinas, Paris, L’Harmattan, Col. « Judaïsme », 2010.
 L’antisionisme. Israël/Palestine aux miroirs d’Occident, Paris, Berg International, 2003.
 Le Vatican et la Shoah. Comment l’Eglise s’absout de son passé, Paris, Berg International, 2000.
 Discours ordinaire et identités juives. La représentation des Juifs et du judaïsme dans les dictionnaires et encyclopédies de langue française, du Moyen-Âge au XXè siècle, Préface de Jean-Pierre Faye, Paris, Berg International, 1999.
 L’envers du destin. Entretiens avec Léon Poliakov, Paris, Bernard de Fallois, 1989.
 La nation captive. Sur la question juive en union soviétique, Paris, Nouvelle Cité, Col. « Rencontres », 1985.
 Les Protocoles des Sages de Sion et la conception policière de l’histoire, in Faux et Usages d’un Faux, dir. P.-A. Taguieff, Paris, Berg International, 1992, T.2, pp. 39–162.

Linguistics, discourse analysis 
 Dictionnaire de pragmatique, Paris, Armand Colin, Col. « Dictionnaires », 2012, en col. Avec J. Longhi.
 Les grandes théories de la linguistique. De la grammaire comparée à la pragmatique linguistique,  Paris, Armand Colin, Col. « Fac Université », 2003, en col. Avec M.-A. Paveau, traductions polonaise et brésilienne.
 Eléments d’analyse du discours, Paris, Paris, Armand Colin, Col. « 128 », 1ère éd. 1996, 2è éd. 2012, traduction chinoise et brésilienne.
 Précis de pragmatique, Paris, Armand Colin, Col. « 128 », 2003.
 La sémantique : De l’énonciation au sens commun. Eléments d’une pragmatique topique, HDR, 1996. En ligne sur www.revue-texto.net
 Dire, agir, définir. Dictionnaires et langage ordinaire, Préface de Oswald Ducrot, Paris, L’Harmattan, Col. « Logiques Sociales », 1995.

Translations 
 M. Cloître – L. R. Cohen, K.C. Koren, Traiter les victimes de la maltraitance infantile. Psychothérapie de l’existence interrompue, Paris, Dunod, Col. « L’atelier du praticien », 2014.
 Frankl, V.E., Ce qui ne figure pas dans mes livres. Autobiographie. Paris, Dunod, InterEditions, 2014.
 Frankl, V.E, Nos raisons de vivre. A l’école du sens de la vie, Paris, Dunod, InterEditions, 2009.
 Frankl, V.E., Le Dieu inconscient. Psychothérapie et religion, Paris, Dunod, InterEdition, 2012.

Poetry 
 Tessiture, suivi de Fragments d’une poétique, dessins de Jessica Vaturi , Paris, Editions Caractères, 2014.
 L’heure liguée, suite pour Gramophone, Paris, L’Harmattan, Col. « Poètes des cinq Continents », 2002. Prix Louise-Labé, 2002. 
 Le gramophone d’Ingres, Paris, Les 4 Fils, 1985.

Anthologies 
 Penseurs juifs de France, Paris, L’Harmattan, 2000, J. Eladan
 Poètes juifs de langue française, Paris, Editions de Courcelles, 2010, J. Eladan
 Anthologie de la poésie juive de l’Antiquité à nos jours, Paris, Mazarine/Fayard, P. Hayat, 1985
 Les nouveaux poètes français et francophones,dir. J. Favre – M. Vincenot, Ed. Jean-Pierre Huguet, Col. « Les lettres du temps », 2004.
 Anthologie des poetes du Prix Louise Labe, Paris, Aumage editions, Editions Hybride, 2006

Work supervising 
 Les discours institutionnels en confrontation. Contribution à l’analyse des discours institutionnels et politiques, Paris, L’Harmattan, Col. « Espaces discursifs », 2014, en col. Avec J. Longhi.
 Discours et sens commun, Langages, n°178, Paris, Larousse, 2008.
 Discours, culture, politique. Essai de redéfinition de la fonction critique, Institut Français de Tel-Aviv , Col. « Espace pour un dialogue », Tel-Aviv/Paris, 1998.
 Ethique et écriture, Paris, Les Cahiers de l’Archipel, n°13, Le Hameau éd., 1985.

Articles (selected) 
 « De la sociologie des guerres (G. Bouthoul) à la sociologie des conflits (J. Freund). Quelques remarques sur une dette intellectuelle méconnue », in Julien Freund. La dynamique des conflits, dir. P.-A. Taguieff – P. Hintermeyer – Ph. Raynaud, Berg International, Paris, 2010, pp. 37–45.
 « Antisionisme », in Dictionnaire encyclopédique et critique du racisme, dir. A. Policard – P.-A. Taguieff, Presses universitaires de France, 2013.
 « Rationalisme morbide et judéophobie planétaire. Remarques sur le contexte d'un contre-discours », in Les Pathologies du lien social, Schiboleth/Actualité de Freud, dir. M.-G. Wolkowitz, Paris, Editions des Rosiers, 2013, pp. 107–130.
 « Pour servir d’excursus à l’analyse d’un scandale ordinaire : entours et atours d’une pièce antisémite », In Une pièce de théâtre antisémite à La Rochelle, Paris, Les Etudes du Crif, n °25, 2013, pp. 26–51.
 « Lorsque l’Union européenne nous éclaire sur sa ‘'face sombre'’ : Quelques enjeux du projet de loi-cadre contre la circoncision assimilée à une mutilation sexuelle », Les Etudes du Crif, n°27, 2013, 38 pp.
 « Le fantôme du Rhinocéros et ses doubles », in Controverses, Raison garder: un tournant de l'opinion, n°15, novembre 2010, pp. 90–105.
 « La confusion des clercs: le cas Shlomo Sand ou la naissance du négationnisme israélien », in Controverses, n°11, in Post-Colonialisme et Sionisme, Paris, mai 2009, pp. 78–103.
 « Juifs et Judaïsme dans les dictionnaires français. Le Façonnement de l’opinion commune », in L’Image des Juifs dans l’Enseignement scolaire, AIU, Ed. du Nadir, col. « Le Collège », B. Lefèvre – S. Trigano (éds.), Paris, 2008, pp. 239–251.
 « Viktor Klemperer et la linguistique politique », in Raison Présente, Démonter le langage du pouvoir, n°167, Université de Strasbourg, 2è trim.2008, pp. 9–21.
 « Résurgences et permanence de la « Question juive », in Le Retour de la Question Juive, Perspectives, Revue de l’Université Hébraïque de Jérusalem, MagnèsPress, 2009, pp.147–165.
 « Questionner la limite : A propos de Robert Antelme », in Face à l'extrême, Tangences, n°89, Revue de l'Université du Québec, Montréal, 2007, pp. 107–124.
 « Figures et ferveur de la multitude: la rhétorique muette de la démocratie: à propos de l'alter-mondialisme selon T. Negri », in Controverses, n°1, La théologie politique des altermondialistes, mars 2006, pp. 40–57.
 « Le Moussar : Un autre chemin de renaissance », in Perspectives. Revue de l’université hébraïque de Jérusalem, n°20, Figures de la Renaissance, dir. F. Bartfeld, Magnès Press, Jérusalem, 2013, pp.107–128.
 « Salanter (Israël Lipkin)», in Dictionnaire de psychologie et de psychopathologie des religions, dir. S. Gumper – F. Rausky, Paris, Bayard, 2013, pp.1196–1199.
 « Samson Raphaël Hirsch et l’éthique de la Révélation », in D’où vient la Torah ? Culture et révélation, dir. S. Trigano, Editions in Press, Paris, pp. 117–129.
 « Rabbi Israël Lipkin de Salant et la tradition du Moussar », Kountras, n°140, nov/déc. 2010/Hechvan/Kislev 5771, Jérusalem, pp. 25–35.
 « Samson et l'énigme de la Providence », in Perspectives, De Samson à Superman, Revue de l'Université Hébraïque de Jérusalem, Ed. Magnès, 2011, pp. 43–57.
 « Prendre soin du sens. Note sur une théorie des ensembles critiques (doxanalyse, sémiothérapie, théorie critique du discours) », in Le symbolique aujourd'hui, Schiboleth/Actualité de Freud, dir. M.G. Wolkowitz, Paris, Editions, 2014, pp. 253–265.
 « L’emprise du sens. Note sur les conditions théoriques et les enjeux de l’analyse des discours institutionnels », in Les discours institutionnels en confrontation. Contribution à l’analyse des discours institutionnels et politiques, L’Harmattan, Col. « Espaces discursifs », 2014, pp. 13–46.
 « Subjectivité et institutions de sens : l'horizon socio-discursif du sens commun », in La Tribune Internationale des Langues vivantes, Formes sémantiques, langages et interprétations. Hommage à Pierre Cadiot. Numéro spécial, juillet 2012, pp. 29–41.
 « Analyse du discours et sens commun : institutions de sens, communautés de sens, doxa, idéologie », in Matériaux philosophiques pour l’analyse du discours, dir. Ph. Scheppens- J. Guilhaumou, Presses universitaires de Franche Comté, 2011, pp. 139–173.
 « V. Frankl (1905–1997) : l’Existenzanalyse et la logothérapie», Ecole Française de Daseinsanalyse, Paris, 22 March 2014.
 « La phénoménologie et le mouvement existentiel en psychothérapie », in De Socrate aux neurosciences, dir. M. Vinot – E. Marc, Paris, Dunod, 2014, pp. 74–81.
 « V. Frankl : L’analyse existentielle et la logothérapie », in Aide-mémoire de psychotraumatologie, 2è éd., dir. M. Kédia – A. Sabouraud Seguin, Paris, Dunod, 2013, pp. 26–40.
 « V. Frankl », in Dictionnaire de psychologie et de psychopathologie des religions, dir. S. Gumper – F. Rausky, Paris, Bayard, 2013, pp. 736–738.

References

External links
 Georges-Elia Sarfati's personal homepage
"Language as a Tool against Jews and Israel", Post-Holocaust and Anti-Semitism, No. 17, 1 February 2004 / 9 Shevat 5764

Related search 

 Joseph Gabel
 Gaston Bouthoul
 Pierre-André Taguieff
 Marc Angenot
 Oswald Ducrot
 Michel Pêcheux

Linguists
1957 births
People from Tunis
Tunisian Jews
Academic staff of Tel Aviv University
Academic staff of the School for Advanced Studies in the Social Sciences
Living people
Jewish philosophers
Philosophers of Judaism